Kestenovac is a village in Croatia. It has a population of 39 (2011 census). It has an area of 3.3 km2 and around 70 buildings.

In the village there was an elementary school which was destroyed in the 1991-1995 war.

Kestenovac is located near Ljutoč and Plješevica mountains, and is also near the River Una and Štrbački Buk waterfalls.  It belongs to the Donji Lapac municipality.

Population

According to the 2011 census, Kestenovac had 39 inhabitants.

Note: In 1857 and 1869 this settlement was part of Bosnia and Herzegovina (that time Ottoman Empire), without census data, so population number is calculated. 1880, 1890 and 1900 data are taken from Bosnia and Herzegovina censuses (under occupation control of Austria-Hungary) from 1879, 1885 and 1895. There is also non-included data for the settlement which became part of the Yugoslav federal unit of Bosnia and Herzegovina before the 1948 census. In 1931 data is included in the settlement of Nebljusi. The settlement of Kestenovac became part of the Yugoslav federal unit of Croatia after World War II.

1991 census 

According to the 1991 census, settlement of Kestenovac had 159 inhabitants, which were ethnically declared as:

Austro-hungarian 1910 census 

According to the 1910 census, settlement of Kestenovac had 446 inhabitants, which were linguistically and religiously declared as this:

Note: In 1910 census settlement of Kestenovac was in Bosnia and Herzegovina.

Literature 

  Savezni zavod za statistiku i evidenciju FNRJ i SFRJ, popis stanovništva 1948, 1953, 1961, 1971, 1981. i 1991. godine.
 Knjiga: "Narodnosni i vjerski sastav stanovništva Hrvatske, 1880-1991: po naseljima, autor: Jakov Gelo, izdavač: Državni zavod za statistiku Republike Hrvatske, 1998., ;

References

Populated places in Lika-Senj County